The H class was a series of battleship designs for Nazi Germany's Kriegsmarine, which were intended to fulfill the requirements of Plan Z in the late 1930s and early 1940s. The first variation, "H-39," called for six ships to be built, essentially as enlarged s with  guns and diesel propulsion. The "H-41" design improved the "H-39" ship with still larger main guns, eight  weapons, and reinforced deck armor. The Construction Office of the Oberkommando der Marine (OKM) concluded their work with the "H-41" design, and were not involved in subsequent plans. Two of them, "H-42" and "H-43", increased the main battery yet again, with  pieces, and the enormous "H-44" design ultimately resulted with  guns.

Due to the outbreak of World War II in September 1939, none of the ships were ever completed; only the first two of the "H-39" ships were laid down. What work that had been accomplished was halted; the assembled steel remained on the slipway until November 1941, when the OKM ordered it be sent for scrap and used for other purposes. Contracts for the other four "H-39" type ships had been awarded, but no work was begun on any of them before they were canceled. None of the subsequent designs progressed further than planning stages.

Initial design 

The earliest design studies for "Schlachtschiff H" ("Battleship H") date to 1935, and were near repeats of the early designs for the  ships, armed with  guns. The ship's radius of action was to be at least equal that of the s.

Design work on the ship that came to be designated H-39 began in 1937. The design staff was instructed to improve upon the design for the preceding Bismarck class; one of the requirements was a larger-caliber main battery to match any battleship built by a potential adversary. After Japan refused to ratify the Second London Naval Treaty in April 1936, an escalator clause went into effect that permitted signatories to arm battleships with guns of up to  caliber, something the United States Navy announced it would do with its planned s. By virtue of the Anglo-German Naval Agreement, signed in 1935, Germany was considered to be a party to the other international naval arms limitation treaties.

Admiral Werner Fuchs, responsible for the staff section in the OKM that determined the operating requirements for the ship, discussed the vessel's design with Adolf Hitler, the leader of Germany. Fuchs eventually convinced Hitler that the 40.6 cm gun was the optimal choice for the H-39 design. In 1938, the OKM developed Plan Z, the projected construction program for the German navy. A force of six H-39 class battleships was the centerpiece of the fleet. Plan Z was finalized by January 1939, when Admiral Erich Raeder, the commander of the Kriegsmarine, presented it to Hitler. He approved the plan on 18 January and granted the Kriegsmarine unlimited power to bring the construction program to fruition.

Only four shipyards in Germany had slipways large enough to build the six new battleships. The OKM issued orders for construction of the first two ships, "H" and "J", on 14 April 1939. The contracts for the other four ships, "K", "L", "M", and "N", followed on 25 May. The keels for the first two ships were laid at the Blohm & Voss dockyard in Hamburg and the Deschimag shipyard in Bremen on 15 July and 1 September 1939, respectively. The outbreak of war in September 1939 interrupted the construction of the ships. Work on the first two was suspended and the other four were not laid down, as it was believed they would not be finished before the war was over. Steel for the other four ships had been ordered and partially machined for installation, though no assembly work had begun. It was expected to resume work on the ships after a German victory in the war.

The ships neither received names nor were official name proposals published. The names, which appear in several publications (Hindenburg, Friedrich der Große, Großdeutschland) are pure speculation. The only hint on the names of the units were given by Hitler himself, who mentioned during documented unofficial talks, that he would propose the names Ulrich von Hutten and Götz von Berlichingen for the ships, as these names are not connected with persons of the Third Reich or the country itself, so the loss would not have a significant negative psychological and propaganda effect on the German people.

H-39 specifications

Characteristics and machinery

The hull was constructed from transverse and longitudinal steel frames and featured over 90 percent welding. The hull contained twenty-one large watertight compartments and a double bottom that extended for 89 percent of the length of the keel. Four bilge keels were fitted to improve stability. The ships had an estimated complement of 2,600 officers and enlisted men.

The ships were to be powered by twelve MAN 9-cylinder double acting 2-stroke diesel engines. The engines were arranged in groups of four, on three shafts, and drove three-bladed screws  in diameter. Four auxiliary boilers were installed to provide backup power; two were oil-fired and were located between the central transmission rooms. The other two, a pair of exhaust gas boilers, were placed above them. The design had one main rudder along the keel behind the center shaft and two smaller wing rudders. Electrical power was to be provided by eight 920 kW DC diesel generators at 230 volts and four 460 kW AC diesel generators at 110 volts for a total of 9,200 kW.

Armament

The main armament was to consist of eight 40.6 cm SK C/34 guns in four twin gun turrets. The 40.6 cm (16 in) gun was 52 calibers long and fired at a muzzle velocity of 810 meters per second (2,657 ft/s). The guns used a sliding breech block, as was typical for German naval guns of the period; the breech was fully sealed with a  brass cartridge that contained the  main propellant charge. A bagged fore charge weighing  supplemented the main charge. Rate of fire was expected to be two rounds per minute per gun. Several of the 40.6 cm guns were constructed before work on the ships was halted; these were later employed as coastal guns, including at Battery Lindemann near Sangatte in France.

Twelve  L/55 C28 guns mounted in six twin turrets comprised the ships' secondary battery. They fired a  shell at a muzzle velocity of 875 m/s (2,871 ft/s), and were primarily intended for defense against surface threats. The ships were also to be armed with six  torpedo tubes, all submerged. They were all mounted in the bow, diverging from the centerline by 10 degrees.

Sixteen dual-mounted  L/65 C33 Flak guns provided long-range defense against aircraft. Unlike those mounted on the Scharnhorst and Bismarck classes, these guns were armored to protect their crews from shrapnel, debris, and strafing attacks. The new turrets also provided faster rates of training and elevation as compared to the earlier open mounts. Close-range air defense was provided by a battery of sixteen  L/83 C33 and twenty-four  C38 guns. The 3.7 cm guns were placed in eight twin mounts while the 2 cm guns were arrayed in six Flakvierling quadruple mountings. The 3.7 cm guns were closely grouped amidships and had a single, common ammunition hoist. Historians William Dulin and Robert Garzke note that the anti-aircraft battery as designed was too weak to effectively defend against the high-performance aircraft that came into service in the late 1930s and 1940s, and speculate that "it would have been augmented before the ships were completed."

Armor

The side belt was vertical and was attached directly to the side of the hull, in contrast with the inclined armor belt placed inboard of the side wall used by American and French designers. The German navy did not preserve official estimates for the immunity zone, though Garzke and Dulin created an estimate based on the performance of the US /45 caliber gun firing a  shell. The 16 in shell could penetrate the upper side belt at any range, however, which left the ships exposed above the waterline.

The underwater protection system was broadly similar to the system employed on the Bismarck class. The bulkhead was placed  from the side of the hull, though abreast of the turrets and further in the bow and stern, this distance could not be maintained.

Two armored decks composed of Wotan Hart steel protected the ships from plunging fire and aerial weapons. Concerned with the fate of the battlecruiser  at the Battle of Jutland, the designers opted to provide relatively heavy bow armor for the H-class ships. It was reasoned that direct shell hits would cause localized damage that could be better isolated than damage from splinters, which could cause extensive flooding.

The barbettes upon which the turrets sat were armored with  face-hardened steel above the upper armor deck and  non-cemented steel below the deck. The rear conning tower had 100 mm thick sides and roof, KCA and non-cemented steel, respectively.

Design escalation 

In early July 1940, Hitler ordered the navy to examine new battleship designs and how wartime experience might be incorporated. A study was completed on 15 July, and contained several recommendations for the H-class ships, including increasing the freeboard and strengthening the horizontal protection. In order to maintain displacement and speed and accommodate the increased weight of the additional armor protection, the design staff drew up an informal design, known as "Scheme A." The design removed one of the main battery turrets to save weight; the propulsion system was also increased in power to keep the same speed as the original design. The original diesel-only system was replaced by a hybrid diesel and steam turbine arrangement. The staff also prepared a second design, "Scheme B", which retained the fourth turret and accepted a much higher displacement. This design also incorporated the mixed propulsion system. These studies were abandoned in 1941 after Hitler decided to halt further battleship construction until after the end of the war. The design staff therefore attempted to improve the armor protection for the H-class. The 1940 designs did not form part of the design chain that resulted in the H-41 through H-44 designs.

H-41 

The designers were confronted with a significant problem: any increase in armor could correspondingly increase the displacement and more importantly, the draft. It was necessary to maintain the full-load draft of 11.5 m of the H-39 design for operations in the relatively shallow North Sea. The only option that allowed the displacement to be maintained while armor thicknesses to be increased was to reduce the ships' fuel supplies. A 25 percent cut in range was required, which was deemed unacceptable by the OKM. It was eventually determined that since deep-water anchorages on the Atlantic coast were available, it would be permissible to allow the draft to increase. The initial redesign called for an increase of only , 40 percent of which was additional deck armor, the remainder being used for a larger-caliber main battery.

One of the most significant changes was the decision to bore out the over-sized 40.6 cm guns to 42 cm caliber for the H-41 design. The design staff determined that modifications to the ammunition hoists and loading equipment would be easily effected and that the original turrets could be retained. The OKM was aware that the British had settled on a 40.6 cm gun for the proposed ; the 42 cm gun would grant the H-41 design a significant advantage over these new adversaries. The ships' armament was otherwise unchanged, apart from an increased number of 2 cm anti-aircraft guns, of which there were now to be 34.

Wartime experience with the Scharnhorst class indicated that the torpedo-defense system was insufficiently strong to protect the H-39 design from underwater damage. Beam was therefore increased, with greater width added at the ends of the armored citadel to allow a greater distance between the side wall and the torpedo bulkhead. The stern section of the torpedo bulkhead was also strengthened structurally to allow it to better contain the force of an underwater explosion. The number of large watertight compartments was increased from twenty-one to twenty-two. A triple bottom was also included in the design, the first time this feature was used in a German warship design. The loss of Bismarck in May 1941 also influenced the design; two large skegs were added to the outboard shafts to protect them and increase support for the stern while in drydock. The rudder system was also designed with an explosive charge to detach the rudders in the event they became jammed.

As detailed design continued into 1942, the OKM planned to begin construction six to nine months after demobilization, initially at Blohm & Voss and the Deutsche Werke shipyard in Kiel. Deschimag, which had been awarded the contract for "J", could no longer be used due to the increase in draft, which precluded travel through the shallow Weser. Following the completion of a new, larger dock at the Kriegsmarinewerft in Wilhelmshaven, work would also be done there. The increased size of the ships would have lengthened the building time from four to five years.

H-42 through H-44 

On 8 February 1942, Albert Speer became the Reichsminister for Armaments and Munitions and gained influence over the Navy's construction programs. Speer reassigned some members of the H class design staff to work on new U-boats and other tasks deemed critical to the war effort. The Schiffsneubaukommission (New Ships Construction Commission), intended to liaise with Speer and the OKM, was created and placed under the direction of Admiral Karl Topp. This group was responsible for the design work that resulted in the H-42 type, as well as the subsequent designs. The Construction Office of the OKM formally concluded their work on new battleships with the H-41 type in August 1942 and played no further role in battleship development.

After the completion of the H-41 design, Hitler issued a request for a larger battleship and placed no restrictions on gun caliber or displacement. The results were purely study projects intended to determine the size of a ship with strong enough armor to counter the rapidly increasing power of bombs deployed by the Allies during the war. The Commission did not discuss its activities with Raeder or his successor, Admiral Karl Dönitz, or with other branches in the OKM. As the designs for the H-42, H-43, and H-44 battleships were purely conjectural, no actual work was begun. The German navy did not seriously consider construction on any of the designs, which were so large that they could not have been built in a traditional slipway. The Construction Office of the OKM sought to disassociate itself from the projects, which they found to be of doubtful merit and unnecessary for German victory.

Details on the propulsion systems for these designs are fragmentary and in some cases contradictory. Erich Gröner notes that "some [had] pure [diesel] engine propulsion, others [had] hybrid engine/turbine propulsion systems," but does not record the type and performance for these propulsion systems.

Information on the armament outfits for the designs is equally contradictory. Both sources agree on the armament for H-44, which was to have been eight  guns. Gröner indicates that H-42 and H-43 were to be armed with eight 48 cm guns, while Garzke and Dulin state that the H-42 design was to have retained the 42 cm guns from the H-41 design and H-43 would have also been armed with 50.8 cm pieces. Both works agree that the secondary armament was to have consisted of twelve 15 cm L/55 guns and sixteen 10.5 cm L/65 guns as in the previous designs, though the lighter weapons are disputed. Gröner states that all three designs were to be equipped with twenty-eight 3.7 cm and forty 2 cm anti-aircraft guns, while Garzke and Dulin report only sixteen 3.7 cm guns and forty 2 cm guns for H-43 and H-44 only; H-42 was to have twenty-four 2 cm guns. Both sources concur that six submerged 53.3 cm torpedo tubes were included in each design.

Designs

Footnotes

Notes

Citations

References 
 
 
 
 
 
 
 
 
 
 
 

Plan Z
Battleship classes
 
Abandoned military projects of Germany
Abandoned projects of Nazi Germany
Proposed ships of Germany